This is a list of winners and nominees of the Golden Bell Award for Best Leading Actor in a Miniseries or Television Film.

Winners and nominees

2010s

2020s

References

Leading Actor in a Mini-series, Best
Television awards for Best Actor
Male television actors by award